Pierre Bertholon de Saint-Lazare (21 October 1741 – 21 April 1800) was a French physicist and a member of the  Society of Sciences of Montpellier. He was known for his experiments with electricity.

Publications
 De l’électricité des végétaux (1783) "The electrification of vegetables"
 De l’électricité du corps humain dans l’état de santé et de maladie (1786) "The electricity of the human body in the state of health and disease"
 De l’électricité des météores (1787) "The electricity of the meteors"

References

1741 births
1800 deaths
French physicists